Proepipona is an Afrotropical genus of potter wasps with seven described species.

References

Hymenoptera genera
Potter wasps